María Elena Villapol Blanca (born November 16, 1967) is a retired female judoka from Venezuela. She competed for her native South American country at the 1992 Summer Olympics, where she was eliminated in the quarterfinals of the Women's Extra-Lightweight (– 48 kg) division. Villapol claimed a total number of three bronze medals during her career at the Pan American Games.

References
sports-reference

1967 births
Living people
Venezuelan female judoka
Judoka at the 1992 Summer Olympics
Judoka at the 1991 Pan American Games
Judoka at the 1995 Pan American Games
Olympic judoka of Venezuela
Pan American Games bronze medalists for Venezuela
Pan American Games medalists in judo
Medalists at the 1983 Pan American Games
Medalists at the 1991 Pan American Games
Medalists at the 1995 Pan American Games
20th-century Venezuelan women
21st-century Venezuelan women